2 Days in April is a double album by a free jazz quartet consisting of saxophonists Fred Anderson and Kidd Jordan, bassist William Parker and drummer Hamid Drake, documenting two 1999 concerts at the University of Massachusetts at Amherst and the Massachusetts Institute of Technology at Cambridge. It was released on Eremite, a label founded by producer Michael Ehlers. Anderson and Jordan first meeting was at a mid-80s AACM concert in Chicago, but this is their first recording together.

Reception

In his review for AllMusic, Thom Jurek states:

Phil Freeman, writing for Burning Ambulance, commented: "sprawling, sputtering, ferocious liveage featuring two killer, veteran saxophonists and maybe the best rhythm team in early '00s free jazz. A high-water mark for everyone involved."

The authors of the Penguin Guide to Jazz Recordings wrote: "there is no possibility of detachment from this music, which is either a token of its power or a sign that perhaps it is so intensely private that it fails to communicate."

Track listing
All compositions by Anderson / Drake / Jordan / Parker
Disc One: 1st Day
 – 17:26
 – 11:55
 – 15:44
 – 10:01
Disc Two: 2nd Day
 – 10:00
 – 17:17
 – 17:51

Personnel
Fred Anderson - tenor sax
Hamid Drake - drums 
Kidd Jordan - tenor sax
William Parker - bass

References

2000 live albums
Fred Anderson (musician) live albums
Eremite Records live albums